Rose of the Golden West is a surviving 1927 American silent drama film produced by Richard A. Rowland and released by First National Pictures. It was directed by George Fitzmaurice and starred Mary Astor and Gilbert Roland.

Cast
Mary Astor as Elena Vallero
Gilbert Roland as Juan
Gustav von Seyffertitz as Gomez
Montagu Love as General Vallero
Flora Finch as Senora Comba
Harvey Clark as Thomas Larkin
Roel Muriel as The Mother Superior
André Cheron as The Russian Prince
Romaine Fielding as Secretary
Thur Fairfax as Orderly
William Conklin as Commander Sloat
Christina Montt as Senorita Gonzalez
Cullen Tate

Preservation status
A print of Rose of the Golden West survives in Narodni Filmovy Archiv.

References

External links

Lobby poster

1927 films
American silent feature films
Films directed by George Fitzmaurice
Films based on short fiction
First National Pictures films
American romantic drama films
American black-and-white films
1927 romantic drama films
1920s American films
Silent romantic drama films
Silent American drama films